The 2018 Copa Argentina Final was the 135th and final match of the 2017–18 Copa Argentina. It was played on December 6, 2018 at the Estadio Malvinas Argentinas in Mendoza between Rosario Central and Gimnasia y Esgrima (LP).

Rosario Central defeated Gimnasia y Esgrima (LP) on penalties in the final to win their first title. As champions, they qualified for the 2018 Supercopa Argentina and the 2019 Copa Libertadores group stage.

Qualified teams

Road to the final

Match

Details

Statistics

References

2018 in Argentine football
2017-18
2017–18 domestic association football cups
a
a
Association football penalty shoot-outs